Morgan Peak is a peak rising to about , located  northeast of Mount Leek in the Hauberg Mountains of Palmer Land, Antarctica. It was named by the Advisory Committee on Antarctic Names in 1985 after Commander William A. Morgan, U.S. Navy, command pilot of an LC-130 aircraft in support of a United States Geological Survey geological party to this area in 1977–78, and commanding officer of Antarctic Development Squadron Six (VXE-6) from May 1978 to May 1979.

References

Mountains of Palmer Land